Events from the year 1960 in Taiwan, Republic of China. This year is numbered Minguo 49 according to the official Republic of China calendar.

Incumbents 
 President – Chiang Kai-shek
 Vice President – Chen Cheng
 Premier – Chen Cheng
 Vice Premier – Wang Yun-wu

Events

January
 11 January – The founding of Chi Mei Corporation.

February
 15 February – The reorganization of Forestry Administration Division to Forestry Bureau.

March
 29 March – The launching of National Education Radio.

April
 13 April – The opening of the new building of Taipei Grand Mosque in Daan District, Taipei.

December
 12 December – The establishment of National Property Administration.

Births
 12 January – Chyi Chin, singer and songwriter
 15 January – Ku Chin-shui, decathlete and pole vaulter
 1 April – Lee Wo-shih, Magistrate of Kinmen County (2009–2014)
 2 June – Wu Shiow-ming, Chairperson of Fair Trade Commission (2009–2017)
 9 June – Winston Chao, actor
 10 August – Yang Ching-huang, singer and actor
 25 August – Yen Ching-piao, member of Legislative Yuan (2002–2012)
 31 August – Tsai Shing-hsiang, fencing athlete
 18 November – Jiang Yi-huah, Premier of the Republic of China (2013–2014)
 24 December – Fei Xiang, singer

Deaths
 1 June – Yu Hung-chun, Premier (1954–1958).

References

 
Years of the 20th century in Taiwan